Human flourishing may refer to:

Eudaimonia, human flourishing in Ancient Greek philosophy
Flourishing, a broader concept, belonging to both philosophy and positive psychology.